Milna is a village and municipality on the western side of the island of Brač, Split-Dalmatia County, Croatia. The village has a population of 833.

It is situated in a deep bay oriented towards the island of Mrduja and Split Channel, on the west. The village was settled in the 16th century, by shepherds from Nerežišća.

Milna is known for the Chakavian dialect being spoken here, the only part of the island where this is the case.

Milna was attacked during the Battle of the Dalmatian channels on November 14, 1991, the only settlement on Brač that has been directly attacked during the Croatian War of Independence.

References

External links 

Municipalities of Croatia
Brač
Populated places in Split-Dalmatia County